Musgraveia is a genus of true bugs in the family Tessaratomidae, mostly found in Australia. The two species are Musgraveia antennatus and Musgraveia sulciventris.

References 

Tessaratomidae
Pentatomomorpha genera
Hemiptera of Australia